The Proclamation of Masterpieces of the Oral and Intangible Heritage of Humanity was made by the Director-General of UNESCO starting in 2001 to raise awareness of intangible cultural heritage and encourage local communities to protect them and the local people who sustain these forms of cultural expressions. Several manifestations of intangible heritage around the world were awarded the title of Masterpieces to recognize the value of the non-material component of culture, as well as entail the commitment of states to promote and safeguard the Masterpieces. Further proclamations occurred biennially. In 2008, the 90 previously proclaimed Masterpieces were incorporated into the new Representative List of the Intangible Cultural Heritage of Humanity as its first entries.

Background
UNESCO defines oral and intangible heritage as "the totality of tradition-based creations of a cultural community expressed by a group or individuals and recognized as reflecting the expectations of a community in so far as they reflect its cultural and social identity." Language, literature, music and dance, games and sports, culinary traditions, rituals and mythologies, knowledge and practices concerning the universe, know-how linked to handicrafts, and cultural spaces are among the many forms of intangible heritage. Intangible heritage is seen as a repository of cultural diversity and creative expression, as well as a driving force for living cultures.  Since it can be vulnerable to forces of globalization, social transformation, and intolerance, UNESCO encourages communities to identify, document, protect, promote and revitalize such heritage.

Upon the adoption of the Universal Declaration on Cultural Diversity in November 2001, UNESCO encouraged recognition and protection of intangible heritage in the same way as natural and cultural treasures of tangible heritage are protected.

Although UNESCO has had a program (active since 1972) to protect the world's cultural and natural heritage, known as the World Heritage List, it thought that the List was directed mostly to the protection and representation of tangible, monumental elements of past cultures or natural environment. The Masterpieces of the Oral and Intangible Heritage of Humanity, is UNESCO's response to the call for humanity to widen its concept of cultural heritage by bringing in the intangible aspects.

The idea for the project came from people concerned about Morocco's Jeema' el Fna Square in Marrakesh. The square is known for traditional activities by storytellers, musicians and other performers, but it was threatened by economic development pressures.  In fighting for the protection of traditions, the residents called for action on an international level to recognize the need for the protection of such places—termed as cultural spaces—and other popular and traditional forms of cultural expression.  The UNESCO label of Masterpieces of the Oral and Intangible Heritage of Humanity aims to raise awareness about the importance of oral and intangible heritage as an essential component of cultural diversity.

Proclamations

Beginning in 2001, the new program has started identifying various forms of intangible heritage around the world for safeguarding through a Proclamation. Under this act, national governments acceding to the UNESCO Convention, known as member states, are each allowed to submit a single candidature file, in addition to multi-national nominations, of intangible cultural heritage occurring within their territories. The nominated intangible heritage may fall into two categories as set by the program:
 forms of popular and traditional cultural expressions; or
 cultural spaces, i.e., places where cultural and popular activities are concentrated and regularly take place (markets squares, festivals, etc.)

The nominations are evaluated by a panel of experts in intangible heritage, including specialized non-government organizations (NGOs), and are further scrutinized by a jury, whose 18 members have previously been selected by the UNESCO Director-General. A set of criteria has been created to aid in the assessing of the nominations. The cultural expressions and spaces proposed for proclamation had to:
 demonstrate their outstanding value as masterpiece of the human creative genius;
 give wide evidence of their roots in the cultural tradition or cultural history of the community concerned;
 be a means of affirming the cultural identity of the cultural communities concerned;
 provide proof of excellence in the application of the skill and technical qualities displayed;
 affirm their value as unique testimony of living cultural traditions;
 be at risk of degradation or of disappearing.

Furthermore, the nominees should be in conformity with UNESCO ideals, in particular, with the Universal Declaration of Human Rights. The nomination proposals also had to provide proof of the full involvement and agreement of the local communities and to include an action plan for the safeguarding or promotion of the concerned cultural spaces or expressions, which should have been elaborated in close collaboration with the tradition bearers.

Through the nomination process, the member states are encouraged to compile an inventory of their intangible heritage, raising awareness and protection of these treasures. In turn, the proclaimed Masterpieces receive commitment from UNESCO in financing plans for their conservation.

Proclamations in 2001, 2003 and 2005, designated a total of 90 forms of intangible heritage around the world as Masterpieces:

Current status

The increasing number of candidature files received and number of Masterpieces proclaimed every two years meant that UNESCO's goal of raising awareness on the importance of the protection of intangible heritage has been achieved. The rise in the number of participating member states led to the 2003 adoption of the Convention for the Safeguarding of the Intangible Cultural Heritage, which took effect in 2008. The standard-setting instrument was meant to complement the 1972 World Heritage Convention in its protection of intangible culture.  Following the successful example of the World Heritage Convention's World Heritage List program, UNESCO established the Representative List of the Intangible Cultural Heritage of Humanity.  This superseded the Proclamation program when the Convention took effect in 2008. All the 90 previously proclaimed Masterpieces, which would be called elements, were featured as the first entries on the new List.

The process for designating an element for the list follows similar steps as the Proclamation.  The former role of the jury was supplanted by a new body known as the Intergovernmental Committee for the Safeguarding of Intangible Cultural Heritage.

In addition, UNESCO established a separate program, identifying elements for the List of Intangible Cultural Heritage in Need of Urgent Safeguarding, to highlight elements at risk despite the efforts of the local community to preserve and protect it, as a result of which it cannot be expected to survive without immediate safeguarding.  It also established a fund to provide emergency assistance for the preservation of such elements.

In 2003, UNESCO drafted the Convention for the Safeguarding of the Intangible Cultural Heritage, which provides an international framework, source of funding, and strategic overview for the further identification and protection of these masterpieces and other intangible cultural heritages. The Convention went into force on 2006, and has since been approved by over 130 members.

References

External links
 
 Defending Threatened Cultures by Juan Goytisolo, Chairman of the International Jury for the 2001 Proclamation 
 Dédalo Project. Open Software for Management of Intangible Cultural Heritage and Oral History

 
Traditions
UNESCO
Cultural heritage
Traditional knowledge

pt:Patrimônio Oral e Imaterial da Humanidade